Arang may refer to:

Arang, town and a nagar panchayat in Raipur District in the state of Chhattisgarh, India
Arang (film) (아랑, Arang), 2006 South Korean horror film
Arang (Korean folklore), figure in the folklore of the Miryang area of Korea
 Tale of Arang, a 2012 South Korean MBC television series

See also
Batu Arang, coal main mining town in Selangor, Malaysia
Calon Arang, character in Javanese and Balinese folklore from the 12th century
 Aarong, Bangladeshi department stores